Route 5 is a state highway in the U.S. state of Rhode Island.

Route description
Route 5 starts at US 1 in Warwick near Gorton Pond. It runs north over I-95 without an interchange before intersecting Route 2 in Cranston. It continues north, generally paralleling I-295. After passing US 44 near Greenville, Route 5 crosses the Stillwater Reservoir on a short causeway. Continuing north, Route 5 has a short concurrency with Route 7, and it continues to North Smithfield. Route 5 crosses the Route 146 expressway without an interchange and terminates at the Massachusetts state line, though the northernmost Route 5 shields are around Route 102 at the south end of the Route 146A concurrency.

History

It was renumbered Route 5 and extended north by 1934.

Major intersections

References

External links

2019 Highway Map, Rhode Island

005
Transportation in Kent County, Rhode Island
Transportation in Providence County, Rhode Island